A curtain call is a return of individuals to the stage to be recognized by the audience for their performance.  

Curtain call may also refer to:

Film
Curtain Call (1940 film), an American film comedy
Curtain Call (1998 film), a film by Peter Yates
Curtain Call (2000 film), a documentary film

Music
Curtain Call (Hank Mobley album), 1957
Curtain Call: The Hits, a 2005 greatest hits album by Eminem
Curtain Call 2, a 2022 greatest hits album by Eminem
Curtain Call (UK album), a 2015 live album by UK
"Curtain Call" (Nina Sky song), 2008
"Curtain Call" (Aiden Grimshaw song), 2012
"Curtain Call" (The Damned song), 1980

Television
Curtain Call (Australian TV series), a 1960s Australian TV series
Curtain Call (American TV series), a 1952 American TV series
"Curtain Call" (American Horror Story), a 2015 American Horror Story episode
Curtain Call (South Korean TV series), a 2022 South Korean TV series
An event involving a group of professional wrestlers known as The Kliq, often referred to as "Curtain Call"

Other
Theatrhythm Final Fantasy: Curtain Call, a rhythm video game

See also
Curtain (disambiguation)